Baesweiler is a municipality in the district of Aachen, North Rhine-Westphalia, Germany.

Geography 
Baesweiler is located approximately 20 km north-east of Aachen.

Neighbouring municipalities
 Geilenkirchen
 Linnich
 Aldenhoven
 Alsdorf
 Herzogenrath
 Übach-Palenberg

Division of the municipality 

The municipality has seven subdivisions since a local government reform in 1972 (populations as of January 2007):
 Baesweiler (13,864 inhabitants)
 Beggendorf (1,667 inhabitants)
 Floverich (408 inhabitants)
 Loverich (1,255 inhabitants)
 Oidtweiler (2,731 inhabitants)
 Puffendorf (441 inhabitants)
 Setterich (7,794 inhabitants)

History 
In 1371 a battle took place between the armies of Wenceslaus I, duke of Brabant on one hand, and Gulik and Gelre on the other. Wenceslaus, upon his capture, suffered a humiliating defeat.

Population development
 1950: 13.268
 1970: 24.223
 1998: 26.731
 2000: 27.434
 2002: 27.604
 2004: 27.933
 2006: 28.160
 2008: 27.991
 2010: 27.898
 2012: 26.445
 2014: 26.597
 2015: 26.819

Twin towns – sister cities

Baesweiler is twinned with:
 Montesson, France (1990)

Notable people
Matthias Goebbels (1836–1911), priest and artist
Franz Loogen (1919–2010), pioneer of cardiology in Germany
Ralph Gunesch (born 1983), footballer

References

External links 

 Official site 

Towns in North Rhine-Westphalia
Aachen (district)